Symplocos anomala is a plant in the family Symplocaceae.

Description
The bark is grey or brown. Its flowers feature a white corolla. The fruit is purple to black when ripe.

Distribution and habitat
Symplocos anomala is native to Japan, China, Taiwan, Myanmar, Thailand, Borneo and Sumatra.

References

anomala
Flora of Japan
Flora of China
Flora of Taiwan
Flora of Indo-China
Flora of Malesia
Plants described in 1900